Aristida ramosa (common name Purple wiregrass) is a species of grass (in the family Poaceae) that occurs in New South Wales, Victoria, Western Australia and Queensland. However, it is thought to have been introduced into Western Australia. It was first described by Robert Brown in 1810  who find it live at Port Jackson (Sydney). The species epithet, ramosa, is a Latin adjective  meaning "branched"  which describes the plant as bearing branches.

Description
A ramosa is a tufted perennial, with smooth internodes, growing from 37 to 120 cm high. The inflorescences are 8 to 27 cm long by 1.5 to 2 cm wide. It grows in Bluegrass downs (Dichanthium spp.), Brigalow, Eremophila, Eucalyptus and Triodia communities in varied soils, and flowers and fruits all year round.

See also
List of Aristida species

References

ramosa
Flora of Australia
Plants described in 1810
Taxa named by Robert Brown (botanist, born 1773)